Guyana Football Federation (GFF) National Super League was the top division in Guyana. It was replaced by the GFF Elite League beginning with the 2015–16 season.

The league used regional qualifying tournaments to determine participants. In its last installment in 2013–14, five  teams from Georgetown, three from Upper Demerara, three from East Coast Demerara, two from Berbice, two from West Demerara, and one from East Bank Demerara were represented.

Before the Super League started the top league was the National Football League which was last held in 2001, but there are several Regional Championships held in the country (Bartica SL, Berbice FL, East Bank FUSSFL, East Coast Demerara, Banks DIH Milk Stout League, Georgetown FL, Upper Demerar SL).

Guyana National Football League 2013/14
 Alpha United (Georgetown)
 Buxton United (East Coast Demerara)
 BV/Triumph United (Relegated) (East Coast Demerara)
 Den Amstel (West Coast Demerara)
 Grove Hi-Tech
 Guyana Defence Force (Georgetown)
 Mahaica Determinators (Relegated)
 Milerock (Linden)
 New Amsterdam United
 Riddim Squad
 Rosignol United (Berbice)
 Santos (Relegated) (Georgetown)
 Silver Shattas
 Western Tigers (Georgetown)
 Winners Connection
 Young Achievers (Relegated)

Previous winners
Champions were:

Performance by club

Best Scorers

References

External links
Federation Site
League at FIFA
League at soccerway.com

 
1
Top level football leagues in the Caribbean
1990 establishments in Guyana
Sports leagues established in 1990